Ustjanowa may refer to the following places in Poland:

Ustjanowa Dolna
Ustjanowa Górna